Ramachandra Raju, better known as Garuda Ram, is an Indian actor who primarily appears in Kannada and Tamil films. He rose to fame for his role as the antagonist Garuda in the K.G.F film series.

Career 
Prior to acting, Raju worked as Yash's bodyguard. Raju made his film debut K.G.F: Chapter 1 (2018). He played the antagonist in the film and garnered acclaim for his portrayal of Garuda. His role in the film enabled him to get offers in several other Tamil and Kannada-language films. Raju played the villain in Sulthan directed by Bakkiyaraj Kannan. He will feature in Jana Gana Mana directed by I. Ahmed. He will feature in Yaanai and Ulaganayagan 233.

Filmography

Awards and nominations

References

External links 

1980 births
Indian male film actors
Male actors in Tamil cinema
Male actors in Telugu cinema
Male actors in Kannada cinema
Living people
Male actors from Bangalore
21st-century Indian male actors
Kannada male actors
South Indian International Movie Awards winners